USMobile, Inc. is an Irvine, California-based corporation that developed the commercial enterprise version Scrambl3 of NSA's Fishbowl (secure phone) techniques. The Scrambl3 apps runs both on Android and iOS platforms.

History

Cyvergence Corporation, founded in 1987, was an Irvine, CA-based Voice-over-IP (VoIP) service provider and developer of VoIP virtualization software for Enterprise Linux servers.  USMobile spun off from Cyvergence Corporation in 2013.  USMobile launched its first product Scrambl3 for Android on the Google Play Store in June 2015 and launched Scrambl3 for iOS on Apple Store in January 2016.

References

External links

Cryptography companies
Companies based in Irvine, California
Defunct software companies of the United States